The Syrian Republican Guard, also known as the Presidential Guard, is an elite 25,000 man mechanized division, although it may actually approach corps size with around 60,000 guardsman. Its main purpose is to protect the capital of Syria, Damascus, from any foreign or domestic threats. The Guard was the only Syrian military unit allowed within the capital before the civil war.

History
The Guard was formed in 1976 after the Syrian occupation of Lebanon to protect the increasingly unpopular president Hafez al-Assad. Major-General Adnan Makhlouf commanded the Guard from 1976 until 1997. The Republican Guard is used mostly to protect top Syrian government officials from any external threats and to serve as a counter-weight to the other powerful Syrian Army formations near the capital, the 4th Mechanized Division, the 3rd Armoured Division, and the 14th Special Forces (Airborne) Division. Many members of the Assad family have served in the Republican Guard. The current president Bashar al-Assad was a Colonel, and was given control of a brigade. His younger brother Maher was also a Colonel in the Republican Guard.

Structure

At the outset of the 2011 conflict, the Republican Guard included three mechanized brigades and two "security regiments." The overall force structure is comparable to a conventional mechanized infantry division, but like the 4th Armored Division, the Republican Guard is outfitted with better equipment and maintained at full strength.

Order of Battle (2017)
In the last days of October 2017, Jane's Information Group published in its Jane's Intelligence Review an article on the current military situation of the Syrian Arab Army and its future challenges.

The text reflects the transformation that the battle order has presented through the conflict, from the old order of battle of the soviet influence to the current one, more adapted to the new challenges.

Before 2011, it was difficult to access reliable information about the SAA because of the Damascus government's sensitivity to potential espionage, particularly by Israel. However, the civil war has provided analysts with considerable insight into the Syrian  military.
 101st Infantry "Security" Regiment
 102nd Infantry "Security" Regiment (part of 30th Division?)
 102nd Commando Regiment
 103rd Commando Brigade
 Syrian Marines
 104th Airborne Brigade (merged with the 800th Regiment)
 105th Mechanized Brigade
 106th Mechanized Brigade
 124th Special Forces Brigade (part of 30th Division)
 800th Regiment* (merged with the 104th brigade)
 80th Battalion*
 83rd Battalion*
 416th Regiment*
 112th Brigade**
 117th Brigade**
The main ground combat unit of the Syrian military is often called a brigade or regiment and is between 500 and 1,000 strong. This is considerably smaller than a corresponding Western formation of that designation. For reasons of esprit de corps, these retain their pre-civil war titles as tank, infantry, mechanised, artillery, special forces, airborne, or Republican Guard brigades or regiments. However, their internal organisation is now very different from their pre-civil war structure.

(*)They are subunits that were previously subordinated to one of the original brigades, but that for tactical reasons of the civil war became independent units that depend directly on the General Staff. They perform functions as minor task forces.

(**)New Creation

Other alleged units:-
Lionesses of Defense Armored Battalion
100th Artillery Regiment
30th Division
Popular Security and Support Forces

Operational history in the Syrian Civil War
At the beginning of the Syrian civil war, the Republican Guard kept out of the conflict, with only the regular Syrian Armed Forces fighting.

In June 2012, the Republican Guard clashed with rebels near its housing compounds and bases in the suburbs of Qudsaya and al-Hamah, about 8 kilometers from central Damascus.

The unit has been accused by Human Rights Watch of engaging in human rights abuses during the conflict. In 2012, Republican guard units played an important role in repelling opposition offensives on Damascus and Aleppo.

Later on, Republican Guard units were deployed to government bases in the North and East of the country, in order to bolster and stiffen the resistance against rebel advances.

400 Syrian Republican Guard fighters were reportedly called in as reinforcements during the Battle of Al-Hasakah.

The 103rd brigade reportedly operated in the Latakia province where (in 2013) it assisted other pro-government units in stopping opposition assaults on the Alawit heartland. The brigade also reportedly participated in offensive operations which partially expelled rebels from the Latakia province.

The 124th brigade reportedly participated in the successful defense of IS attacks on the Tabqa airbase in 2014, before the evacuation of the airport. The brigade reportedly defended the Ithriya-Khanasser highway thus preserving a major supply line to Aleppo. The brigade was reported in January 2018 directing the capture of the al-Hass Plain and the Offensive towards Abu-Duhur from the north (front of south Aleppo)

The 104th brigade is well known in the media due to its multi-year deployment against ISIL in Deir ez-Zor. Deployed to the area in late 2012, according to some sources (other sources state that the brigade was not deployed to Deir ez-Zor before early 2014), the brigade, along with other SAA elements, defended pro-government-held territory in Deir ez-Zor. The brigade was largely under siege from January 2015, supported from the air by the Syrian Arab Air Force and Russian Air Force. In early 2018 reports emerged that the unit was transferred back to Damascus.

In 2016 elements of the 102nd, 106th brigades and the 800th regiment were reported to have taken part in the successful Aleppo campaign which expelled opposition elements from the city.

In late 2016 and early 2017, together with other pro-government units, the 800th regiment was reported to have stopped an ISIL offensive by defending the T4 airbase and preventing a possible ISIL assault on Homs.

105th brigade was largely employed in Damascus and the surrounding areas, mainly focusing on the East Ghouta front which has been an opposition stronghold for years, reportedly containing 25,000 opposition fighters.

Following several deployments to the Aleppo front the 106th brigade reportedly returned to the Damascus operating area where it continued combat operations.

On October 18, 2017, Issam Zahreddine, a Major General leading the Syrian government's fight against ISIL in Deir ez-Zor and known as "Lion of the Republican Guard," was killed when a land mine struck his vehicle in the Hwaijet Saqer area of Deir ez-Zor's countryside during a military operation.

In March 2021, its commander since January 2021, Major General Malik Aliaa (formerly Commander of the Republican Guard’s 30th Division) was sanctioned by the United Kingdom, which named him as "Responsible for the violent repression of the civilian population by troops under his command, particularly during the increased violence of the offensives on north-west Syria of 2019-2020."

Uniform and insignia
The Republican Guard uniform is distinct from the regular Army uniform. Service dress consists of woodland camouflage worn with red berets, rather than the standard black or green, red epaulettes, red lanyards, and brown leather belts with green camouflaged shoes. On ceremonial occasions, officers wear red peaked caps instead of a beret.

Weapons
The Republican Guard tends to usually be better equipped than the standard Syrian Army. The Republican Guard has been documented and photographed using the American made M-16 5.56×45mm rifle. The Soviet made AKM 7.62×39mm rifle is also used with a folding stock which makes it the AKMS variant. The AK-74 and the AKS-74U Carbine is used along with the more modern AK-74M which both are chambered for 5.45×39mm. The AK-74M rifles are believed to have entered Syria in the mid to late 1990s following a deal with Russia.The AK-74M is also sometimes seen with an NSPU night vision optic sight or a GP-25 Grenade Launcher in some cases.

Members of the Republican Guard have also been seen with the Glock handgun which is in their holster. The Makarov PM 9×18mm pistol has also been seen in use with the Guard and in holsters. Maher al-Assad, who is in the Republican Guard as a Commander and also is the brother of current President Bashar al-Assad, is seen with a Springfield Armory XD pistol in his holster while visiting troops.

The NSV machine gun chambered for 12.7×108mm has also been used by the Republican Guard during the civil war and is usually seen being used whilst the guard members are in a building firing at rebels. The PKM machine gun chambered in 7.62×54mmR is also used by the Republican Guard.

See also
 Issam Zahreddine
 Republican Guard
 Presidential Guard (disambiguation)

References

Further reading
 Kenneth M. Pollack, Arabs at War: Military Effectiveness 1948–91, University of Nebraska Press, Lincoln and London, 2002, and Pollack's book reviewed in International Security, Vol. 28, No.2.
 Richard Bennett, "The Syrian Military: A Primer" MEIB Bulletin, Vol. 3, No. 8, August/September 2001

Military units and formations of Syria
Divisions of Syria
Guards regiments
Protective security units
Military units and formations established in 1976
Military units and formations of the Cold War
Pro-government factions of the Syrian civil war
1976 establishments in Syria